Adventures of the Imagination is a solo album released in 2000 by guitar virtuoso Michael Schenker. The album is Schenker's fourth all-instrumental effort and over-all critical response was positive.

Track listing 
All songs composed by Michael Schenker.

 "Achtung Fertig, Los!" - 4:40
 "Open Gate" - 3:32
Adventures Part One
"Three Fish Dancing" - 14:01
 "Michael Schenker Junior" - 1:54
Adventures Part Two
"Aardvark in a VW Smoking a Cigar" - 13:46
 "I Want to be with You" - 2:39
Adventures Part Three
"Old Man with Sheep on Mars" - 6:15
 "At the End of the Day" - 3:58
 "Hand in Hand" - 2:57

Personnel 
Michael Schenker – all guitars
John Onder – bass
Aynsley Dunbar – drums

Production 
Michael Schenker – producer
Mike Varney – producer
Ralph Patlan – associate producer, engineering, mixing

References 

2000 albums
Michael Schenker albums
Albums produced by Mike Varney
Shrapnel Records albums
Instrumental rock albums